Khatukai may refer to:
Hatuqwai, a western Circassian tribal princedom
Khatukay, a village (aul) in the Republic of Adygea, Russia